Freedcamp is a web, mobile and desktop project management and collaboration system for teams. The company was launched in 2010 in Santa Barbara, California by founder Angel Grablev.

Freedcamp is free for an unlimited number of users, files, and projects. All users have access to a number of essential applications to manage projects and a wide variety of additional production tools that can be purchased as a part of their paid plans. The free offering allows users to assign tasks to people, set milestones, schedule events on a calendar, use discussion boards, and track time spent on tasks.

Freedcamp is often noted as a free alternative to Basecamp (software) in terms of the similarity in name, but both the vision and business model differ.

Features 

Free applications:

 Tasks - Shared task lists with subtasks
 Team Collaboration - Invite team members, chat/communicate and share the workload
 Discussions - Forum boards
 File Storage - Advanced file management
 Milestones - Deadline setting
 Calendar - Event scheduling
 Time - Time tracking
 Password Manager - Securely storing passwords
 Tasky - Private task list

Paid applications:

 CRM - Customer relationship management
 Issue Tracker - Advanced workflow issue management
 Invoices - Bill clients with invoices
 Wiki - Create internal or public documentation
 Gantt Charts - Visual way to see when tasks start and end as related to other tasks
 Google Drive - Sync Freedcamp with your Google Drive
 Dropbox - Integrate your Dropbox files inside of Freedcamp
 OneDrive - Access your OneDrive files
 Custom Fields - Ability to set unique fields to be stored within your tasks or projects

Access modes and notifications 

Freedcamp's advanced permission features allow for a project to contain different types of user roles with different access modes. The administrator can set up general users and then assign certain tasks to relevant people with different levels of restriction if needed. There is also a client/guest mode which works like a read-only mode. Users can tag participants in a post so they receive project updates via email.

Payment 

Freedcamp offers unlimited storage for free, the only limit is how large each file you upload is. The current limit for the free plan is 10MB per file. The developers have stated that they intend to keep the system free forever - their basic package is "strictly free, and will remain this way forever." The pricing comes in three plans. Lite, Business, and Enterprise. Each plan is bundled with more of the paid features and additional storage upgrades per file. All paid features are aimed at business use cases and do not prohibit the usage of the system for everyday projects in any way. Since November 2017, Freedcamp uses an adaptive pricing model, pioneered by Slack (software)."

API & Integrations 
In July 2018, Freedcamp released its API to third-party developers and Zapier integration. Freedcamp’s open API provides a means to programmatically read the information in Freedcamp, input information into Freedcamp, and create automations within Freedcamp. This allows customers or third-party developers to build on the Freedcamp platform and customize Freedcamp to the unique way their teams work. Common use cases include automating repetitive tasks, chaining processes, automating reporting on tasks and projects, and syncing with databases or other tools.

The Freedcamp API is a RESTful interface, allowing you to update and access much of your data on the platform. It provides predictable URLs for accessing resources and uses built-in HTTP features to receive commands and return responses. This makes it easy to communicate with a wide variety of environments, from command-line utilities to browser plugins to native applications.

Freedcamp has integrations with other SaaS tools, including Google Calendar, Dropbox, OneDrive, Google Drive, and Zapier. In 2020 Gmail add-in and Outlook add-on were released.

Uses 

Founder Angel Grablev claims that the "uses for Freedcamp are virtually unlimited". Grablev has found that it is not only businesses that use the project, but Freecamp has been used in classrooms, at major universities by both students and teachers, for friends and family organizing trips, and for personal projects at home. American Red Cross and the Make A Wish Foundation have also been known to use Freedcamp for their projects.

Growth 

In an interview with Founders Grid in August 2014, Freedcamp founder Angel Grablev stated that the tool had reached 330,000 users. An infographic produced in October 2014 shows Freedcamp's users have passed 396,000. The system has gained strong momentum, reaching 2 million users after releasing notable industry first innovations.

References

Project management software